Giacomo Breuquet (died 1498) was a Roman Catholic prelate who served as Bishop of Nocera Umbra (1492–1498).

On 31 August 1492, Giacomo Breuquet was appointed during the papacy of Pope Alexander VI as Bishop of Nocera Umbra.
He served as Bishop of Nocera Umbra until his death on 25 May 1498.

References

External links and additional sources
 (for Chronology of Bishops) 
 (for Chronology of Bishops) 

15th-century Italian Roman Catholic bishops
Bishops appointed by Pope Alexander VI
1498 deaths